The 40th Japan National University Rugby Championship (2003/2004). Eventually won by Kanto Gakuin University beating Waseda 33 - 7.

Qualifying teams

Kanto League A (Taiko)
 Waseda, Meiji University, Teikyo University, Keio University, Nihon University

Kanto League B
 Kanto Gakuin University, Hosei University, Tokai University, Ryutsu Keizai University, Tsukuba

Kansai League
 Kyoto Sangyo University, Doshisha University, Osaka University of Health and Sport Sciences, Kinki University, Kwansei Gakuin

Kyushu League
 Fukuoka

Knockout rounds

First-round tournament

Winners of the first round go through to the group stage. Qualifying for the group round:

 Waseda, Meiji University, Teikyo University
 Kanto Gakuin University, Hosei University, Tokai University
 Kyoto Sangyo University, Doshisha University

Group round

Group round stage. Consisting of three rounds of matches with the top 4 qualifying for the semi-finals.

Round 1

Round 2

Round 3

Final Table from the pool stages:

Kanto Gakuin University, Waseda, Hosei University and Doshisha University compete in the semi-finals.

Semi-final

Final

Universities competing

 Waseda
 Meiji University
 Keio University
 Teikyo University
 Kinki University
 Nihon University
 Kanto Gakuin University
 Hosei University
 Tsukuba University
 Daito Bunka University
 Ryutsu Keizai University
 Osaka University of Health and Sport Sciences
 Kyoto Sangyo University
 Doshisha University
 Ritsumeikan
 Kinki University
 Fukuoka

External links
 Rugby union in Japan

References

 The 40th Japan University Rugby Championship - JRFU Official Page (Japanese)
 The 40th Japan University Rugby Championship Final - JRFU Official Page (Japanese)

All-Japan University Rugby Championship
Univ